Silvije Čavlina (born 22 April 1977) is a Croatian retired professional footballer who played as a goalkeeper. He currently serves as a goalkeeping coach of Croatian First Football League club NK Osijek.

Club career
He started his career in the youth system of Lokomotiva and Hajduk Split and subsequently played first-team football with Croatian clubs Hrvatski Dragovoljac, Lokomotiva Zagreb, Inter Zaprešić and Kamen Ingrad. In 2006, he spent seven months with Israeli side Hapoel Petah Tikva, before returning to Croatia in August of the same year to spend the 2006-07 season with Šibenik.

In the summer of 2007, he moved to LASK Linz of the Austrian Bundesliga, where he made a total of 74 league appearances over the following three seasons. In the summer of 2010, he moved to another Austrian Bundesliga side, Sturm Graz, staying for 2 seasons before moving to Inter Zaprešić.

International career
Between 1997 and 2000, he won 8 international caps for the Croatian national under-21 football team.

References

External links

Guardian football

1977 births
Living people
Footballers from Zagreb
Association football goalkeepers
Croatian footballers
Croatia youth international footballers
Croatia under-21 international footballers
NK Hrvatski Dragovoljac players
NK Lokomotiva Zagreb players
NK Inter Zaprešić players
NK Kamen Ingrad players
Hapoel Petah Tikva F.C. players
HNK Šibenik players
LASK players
SK Sturm Graz players
Croatian Football League players
Israeli Premier League players
Austrian Football Bundesliga players
Croatian expatriate footballers
Expatriate footballers in Israel
Croatian expatriate sportspeople in Israel
Expatriate footballers in Austria
Croatian expatriate sportspeople in Austria